ST, St, or St. may refer to:

Arts and entertainment 
 Stanza, in poetry
 Suicidal Tendencies, an American heavy metal/hardcore punk band
 Star Trek, a science-fiction media franchise
 Summa Theologica, a compendium of Catholic philosophy and theology by St. Thomas Aquinas
 St or St., abbreviation of "State", especially in the name of a college or university

Businesses and organizations

Transportation
 Germania (airline) (IATA airline designator ST)
 Maharashtra State Road Transport Corporation, abbreviated as State Transport
 Sound Transit, Central Puget Sound Regional Transit Authority, Washington state, US
 Springfield Terminal Railway (Vermont) (railroad reporting mark ST)
 Suffolk County Transit, or Suffolk Transit, the bus system serving Suffolk County, New York

Other businesses and organizations
 Statstjänstemannaförbundet, or Swedish Union of Civil Servants, a trade union
 The Secret Team, an alleged covert alliance between the CIA and American industry
 STMicroelectronics, a worldwide manufacturer of semiconductors

Geography
 São Tomé and Príncipe (ISO 3166-1 country code ST)
 .st, Internet country code top-level domain for São Tomé and Príncipe
 Saxony-Anhalt, a state of Germany
 Split, Croatia (vehicle plate code ST)
 Stoke-on-Trent postcode area, United Kingdom
 St or St., abbreviation of Saint
 St or St., abbreviation of Street
 St or St., abbreviation of Strait

Language and typography 
 Sesotho language (ISO 639-1 language code "st")
 ﬅ, or st, a typographic ligature
 Standard Theory in generative grammar

Science and technology

Computing
 ST connector, a type of optical fiber connector
 Atari ST, a personal computer
 Prefix of hard disk drives made by Seagate Technology, e.g. ST-506
 Internet Stream Protocol, an experimental Internet protocol
 Structured text, a high-level programming language that syntactically resembles Pascal and is designed for programmable logic controllers (PLC)
 .st, the Internet country code top-level domain (ccTLD) for São Tomé and Príncipe
St (terminal emulator), minimalist terminal emulator by suckless.org

Mathematics
 Standard part function, a term used in non-standard analysis

Physics
 Stanton number St, used in physics
 Strouhal number St, used in fluid mechanics
 String theory

Units of measurement 
 Stokes (unit) (St), a CGS unit of kinematic viscosity
 Stone (weight) (st.), a unit of mass used in the British Isles and other countries

Medicine
 ST segment, the part of an electrocardiogram connecting the QRS complex and the T wave
Sulfotransferase, enzymes that catalyze the transfer of a sulfo group
Heat-stable enterotoxin, secretory peptides produced by some bacterial strains, such as enterotoxigenic Escherichia coli

Other uses 
 -st, a suffix for an ordinal number, such as 1 or 21
 Saint (St or St.), especially in Christianity
 Scheduled Tribes, in India
  Ship prefix for a steam tug
 Sine tempore (s.t.), Latin term indicating that a lecture will begin at the exact time; see Academic quarter (class timing)
 Striker (association football), a position in association football
 ST, a type of London bus

See also
 STST (disambiguation)
 STFC (disambiguation) for uses of ST F.C.